The New Zealand cricket team toured Australia between 13 November 2008 and 15 February 2009. The tour was divided into two legs; commencing with a tour match against New South Wales, the first leg contained two Test matches between New Zealand and Australia in which the sides competed for the Trans-Tasman Trophy.

New Zealand then went home for a series against the West Indies and Australia hosted the South African team. New Zealand returned to Australia on 29 January 2009 for the second leg, comprising a tour match against the Prime Minister's XI, five One Day Internationals (ODIs) against Australia for the Chappell–Hadlee Trophy and a Twenty20 International also against Australia.

Background

The Australian side had recently returned from a tour of India where they had lost the four-match Test series, and with it the Border-Gavaskar Trophy, 2-0. During that series, Australia had repeatedly fallen behind the required over rate; during the final match, captain Ricky Ponting used part-time bowlers to try to catch up rather than push for a victory, a move which was criticised by former captains.

Prior to this series, the New Zealand side had just completed a tour of Bangladesh, winning the test series 1-0 (with one test drawn after three days were lost to rain) and the one-day series 2-1. At the beginning of the test series, they were ranked seventh in the ICC Test Championship. Captain Daniel Vettori said that he "was leading the nucleus of a good side", but pointed out that the inexperienced batting lineup would face a tough task against an Australian side that would be looking to come back strongly from their series loss to India.

Squads

First leg

Tour match

Trans–Tasman Trophy

1st Test

Brisbane had been hit hard with weeks worth of devastating storms, leaving the pitch soft and green. Both teams were returning from the sub-continent and struggled badly with the bat. Australia were all out for just 214 late on day one with Clarke last to go on 98 runs, NZ survived a few overs to finish 0/7 at stumps. The next morning began perfectly for Australia with a wicket on the first ball, and more kept coming. NZ collapsing to be all out for just 156 from 50 overs, Taylor the highest scorer on 40. Australia did not fare much better with Hayden out first ball and Australia limping to 6/131 at stumps on day 2. Katich managed to score 100 and he ended running out of partners finishing not out on 131, seeing Australia to 268. Needing 327 runs to win, NZ got a terrible start and were 4-49 until a good partnership between Flynn and Taylor. However Australia managed two late wickets, one on the last ball of the day putting NZ at 6/143 at stumps on Day 3. Australia bowled NZ out for 177 on Day 4 to give them the 1-0 advantage.

2nd Test

Following the first Test, the Australians called Peter Siddle into the squad with Shane Watson returning to state cricket. Jason Krejza was named in the team after having been twelfth man in the first Test; however, he twisted his ankle in training two days prior to the start of the match and his place was taken by fellow spin bowler Nathan Hauritz.

On the Tuesday before the match began, New Zealand Cricket announced the appointment of Andy Moles as successor of retiring coach John Bracewell. Moles was to take over immediately following the Australian Test series, meaning this was Bracewell's final match in charge of the New Zealand side. The only change to the New Zealand team was Peter Fulton replacing Grant Elliott in an attempt to bolster the batting lineup.

Second leg

Tour match

ODI Series

1st ODI

Australia's top order capitulated with none of the top five scoring over 15 runs. There was some resistance from Hussey and Haddin, but ultimately Australia were unable to bat out the innings, running out of wickets and posting a very low score. Australia did however put the pressure on with the ball and for most of the chase New Zealand was behind Australia score at the same points in time. Michael Clarke clean-bowled a batsman but replays showed that the bails were dislodged by Haddin's gloves, which were in front of the stumps.  The loss was Australia's fourth consecutive ODI loss, having just been defeated 1–4 against South Africa.

2nd ODI

3rd ODI

Australia could have scored 303, but 2 penalty runs were not awarded because the Australian batsmen ran down the pitch (as opposed to beside the pitch, which is the rule) again after being warned not to by the umpire. The rule no runs are obtained from a delivery (ball) if a batsman runs down the pitch.

4th ODI

5th ODI

Rain caused the match to be reduced to 22 overs. The New Zealand innings was further reduced to 20 overs. Heavy rain caused the match to be abandoned when New Zealand were 123.

Only T20I

Gallery

References

Chappell-Hadlee Trophy
2008–09 Australian cricket season
Chappell-Hadlee Trophy
2008-09
Aus
New
New
International cricket competitions in 2008–09